Denis Ciobotariu (born 10 June 1998) is a Romanian professional footballer who plays as a defender for Liga I club Sepsi OSK.

Club career
In 2017, Ciobotariu signed a contract with Dinamo București.

CFR Cluj reached an agreement with Dinamo in January 2020 to buy Ciobotariu for 150,000 euros.

Personal life
He is the son of former Romanian international and current football coach Liviu Ciobotariu.

Career statistics

Club

Honours

Club
CFR Cluj
Liga I: 2019–20, 2020–21, 2021–22
Supercupa României: 2020

Voluntari
Cupa României runner-up: 2021–22

Sepsi OSK
Supercupa României: 2022

References

External links
 
 
 
 

1998 births
Living people
Footballers from Bucharest
Romanian footballers
Association football defenders
Romania youth international footballers
Romania under-21 international footballers
Liga I players
Liga II players
FC Dinamo București players
AFC Chindia Târgoviște players
CFR Cluj players
FC Voluntari players
Sepsi OSK Sfântu Gheorghe players